Book of Days is the seventh album by Meredith Monk, released in 1990 through ECM New Series.

Track listing

Personnel 
Musicians
Johanna Arnold – vocals (3–4, 6, 11–12)
Joan Barber – vocals (3–4, 6, 11–12)
Robert Een – vocals (2–6, 10–12), cello (13)
John Eppler – vocals (3–4, 6, 11–12)
Ching Gonzalez – vocals (2–4, 6, 11–12)
Andrea Goodman – vocals (2–6, 9–12)
Wayne Hankin – vocals (5–6, 12), bagpipes (7), hurdy-gurdy (7)
Naaz Hosseini – vocals (1–6, 10–13), violin (13)
Meredith Monk – vocals
Toby Newman – vocals (8, 14)
Nicky Paraiso – vocals (2–4, 6, 11–12)
Timothy Sawyer – vocals (3–4, 6, 11–12)
Nurit Tilles – keyboards (3–4, 6), Hammond organ (14)
Production
Manfred Eicher – production
James Farber – recording
Jan Erik Kongshaug – mixing
Dominique Lasseur – photography
Barbara Wojirsch – design

References

External links 
 

1990 albums
Albums produced by Manfred Eicher
ECM New Series albums
Meredith Monk albums